A Macintosh clone is a computer running the Mac OS operating system that was not produced by Apple Inc. The earliest Mac clones were based on emulators and reverse-engineered Macintosh ROMs. During Apple's short lived Mac OS 7 licensing program, authorized Mac clone makers were able to either purchase 100% compatible motherboards or build their own hardware using licensed Mac reference designs.

Since Apple's switch to the Intel platform, many non-Apple Wintel/PC computers are technologically so similar to Mac computers that they are able to boot the Mac operating system using a varying combination of community-developed patches and hacks.  Such a Wintel/PC computer running macOS is more commonly referred to as a Hackintosh.

Background
The Apple II and IBM PC computer lines were "cloned" by other manufacturers who had reverse-engineered the minimal amount of firmware in the computers' ROM chips and subsequently legally produced computers that could run the same software.  These clones were seen by Apple as a threat, as Apple II sales had presumably suffered from the competition provided by Franklin Computer Corporation and other clone manufacturers, both legal and illegal. At IBM, the threat proved to be real: most of the market eventually went to clone-makers, including Compaq, Leading Edge, Tandy, Kaypro, Packard Bell, Amstrad in Europe, and dozens of smaller companies, and in short order IBM found it had lost control over its own platform.

Apple eventually licensed the Apple II ROMs to other companies, primarily to educational toy manufacturer Tiger Electronics in order to produce an inexpensive laptop with educational games and the AppleWorks software suite: the Tiger Learning Computer (TLC).  The TLC lacked a built-in display.  Its lid acted as a holster for the cartridges that stored the bundled software, as it had no floppy drive.

Emulators
Long before true clones were available, the Atari ST could emulate a Mac by adding the third-party Magic Sac emulator, released in 1985, and, later, the Spectre, Spectre GCR, and Aladin emulators. The first three of those emulators required that the user purchase a set of Mac ROMs sold as system upgrades to Macintosh users. Later, multiple emulators were released for the Amiga.

Starting with the sales of PowerPC Macs, a CPU emulator to run 68000 applications was built into the Mac OS. By the time 68060 processors were available, PowerPC Macs became so powerful that they ran 68000 applications faster than any 68000-based computer, including any Amiga, Atari ST or Sharp X68000. This means even a 68060-upgraded Atari ST clone or Amiga, which avoid CPU emulation, were always slower, on top of causing some programs not to work thanks to imperfect virtualization of the Mac system and remaining machine components.

Connectix also released another 68k emulator for Macs, replacing the original, called Speed Doubler, supposedly reported to be even faster than Apple's. As the years went by, the emulator wasn't updated to work with later versions of the original Mac OS, however, supposedly because Apple's own 68k emulator eventually surpassed it in performance, and the OS itself relied further on native PowerPC code with each new Mac OS update.

There was also a software emulator for x86 platforms running DOS/Windows and Linux called Executor, from ARDI. ARDI reverse-engineered the Mac ROM and built a 68000 CPU emulator, enabling Executor to run most (but not all) Macintosh software, from System 5 to System 7, with good speed. The migration from 68000 to PowerPC, and the added difficulties of emulating a PowerPC on x86 platforms, made targeting the later Mac OS versions impractical.

Unlicensed clones 
Wary of repeating history and wanting to retain tight control of its product, Apple's Macintosh strategy included technical and legal measures that rendered production of Mac clones problematic. The original Macintosh system software contained a very large amount of complex code, which embodied the Mac's entire set of APIs, including the use of the GUI and file system. Through the 1980s and into the 1990s, much of the system software was included in the Macintosh's physical ROM chips. Therefore, any competitor attempting to create a Macintosh clone without infringing copyright would have to reverse-engineer the ROMs, which would have been an enormous and costly process without certainty of success. Only one company, Nutek, managed to produce "semi-Mac-compatible" computers in the early 1990s by partially re-implementing System 7 ROMs.

This strategy, making the development of competitive Mac clones prohibitively expensive, successfully shut out manufacturers looking to create computers that would directly compete with Apple's product lines. However, companies like Outbound Systems, Dynamac and Colby Systems, were able to sidestep the Mac cloning process by targeting high-end, high-profit market segments without suitable product offerings from Apple and offering Mac conversions instead.

In the early 1980s, Brazil's military dictatorship instituted trade restrictions that prohibited the importation of computers from overseas manufacturers, and these restrictions were not lifted until 1993. A Brazilian company called Unitron (which had previously produced Apple II clones) developed a Macintosh clone with specifications similar to the Mac 512K, and proposed to put it on sale. Although Unitron claimed to have legitimately reverse-engineered the ROMs and hardware, and Apple did not hold patents covering the computer in Brazil, Apple claimed the ROMs had simply been copied. Ultimately, under pressure from the US government and local manufacturers of PC clones the Brazilian Computer and Automation Council did not allow production to proceed.

Hackintosh

When Apple migrated to the PC-Intel platform in the mid 2000s, Apple hardware was more or less the same as generic PC hardware from a platform perspective. This theoretically allowed for installation of Mac OS X on non-Apple hardware. Hackintosh is the term appropriated by hobbyist programmers, who have collaborated on the Internet to install versions of Mac OS X v10.4 onwards dubbed Mac OSx86  to be used on generic PC hardware rather than on Apple's own hardware. Apple contends this is illegal under the DMCA, so in order to combat illegal usage of their operating system software, they continue to use methods to prevent Mac OS X (now macOS) from being installed on unofficial non-Apple hardware, with mixed success. At present, with proper knowledge and instruction, macOS installation is more or less straightforward.  Several online communities have sprung up to support end-users who wish to install macOS on non-Apple hardware.  Some representative examples of these are Dortania and InsanelyMac.

Psystar Corporation

In April 2008, Psystar Corporation based in Miami, Florida, announced the first commercially available OSx86, a Wintel/PC computer with Mac OS X Leopard pre-installed partially with software from the OSx86 community project. Apple immediately sued in July 2008 and a protracted legal battle followed, ending in November 2009 with a summary judgement against Psystar. In May 2012, the U.S. Supreme Court denied Psystar's appeal, closing the case for good.

Licensed clones

In 1992, Macworld published an editorial stating that Apple clones were coming, and that the company should license its technology to others so it would benefit as the overall Macintosh market grew.

By 1995, Apple Macintosh computers accounted for around 7% of the worldwide desktop computer market. Apple executives decided to launch an official clone program in order to expand Macintosh market penetration.  Apple's Mac OS 7 licensing program entailed the licensing of the Macintosh ROMs and system software to other manufacturers, each of which agreed to pay a flat fee for a license, and a royalty (initially ) for each clone computer they sold. This generated quick revenues for Apple during a time of financial crisis.

From early 1995 through mid-1997, it was possible to buy PowerPC-based clone computers running Mac OS, most notably from Power Computing and UMAX. However, by 1996 Apple executives were worried that high-end clones were cannibalizing sales of their own high-end computers, where profit margins were highest.

A total of 75 distinct Macintosh clone models are known to have been introduced during the licensee era.

The following companies produced licensed Mac clones:

Jobs ends the official program
Soon after Steve Jobs returned to Apple in 1997, he personally tried to renegotiate licensing deals more favorable to Apple five times over the course of three weeks and in his words each time was "basically told to pound sand". This response caused him to halt negotiations of upcoming licensing deals with OS licensees that Apple executives complained were still financially unfavorable.

Because the clone makers' licenses were valid only for Apple's System 7 operating system, Apple's release of Mac OS 8 left the clone manufacturers without the ability to ship a current Mac OS version and effectively ended the cloning program. Only UMAX ever obtained a license to ship Mac OS 8 and get Mac OS 8 upgrade disks, which expired in July 1998 (Power Computing also got Mac OS 8 disks by their acquisition by Apple).

All other manufacturers had their Macintosh clone contract terminated by late 1997 and either continued their brands as PC clones or discontinued them altogether. Some of the clone manufacturers even went out of business. Reportedly, a heated telephone conversation between Jobs and Motorola CEO Christopher Galvin resulted in the contentious termination of Motorola's clone contract, and the long-favored Apple being demoted to "just another customer" mainly for PowerPC CPUs.

In 1999, Jobs had discussions with Ben Rosen, Chairman and interim CEO of Compaq at the time, for the world's then-largest Wintel PC manufacturer to license Mac OS, which would have been a coup for Apple. However no agreement was reached, as Apple had second thoughts about licensing its "crown jewel", while Compaq did not want to offend Microsoft, which it had partnered with since its founding in 1982. By 2007, five years after Compaq merged with HP, Rosen told Jobs he had switched to being a Mac user.

In 2001, Jobs reportedly had a meeting with Sony executives, saying he was "willing to make an exception" for Sony VAIO to run Mac OS X, although the negotiations later fell through.

Since Apple transitioned the Macintosh to an Intel platform in 2006, and subsequent to a major increase in visibility and a gain in computer market share for Apple with the success of the iPod, large computer system manufacturers such as Dell have expressed renewed interest in creating Macintosh clones. While various industry executives, notably Michael Dell, have stated publicly that they would like to sell Macintosh-compatible computers, Apple VP Phil Schiller said the company does not plan to let people run Mac OS X (macOS) on other computer makers' hardware. "We will not allow running Mac OS X on anything other than an Apple Mac," he said.

Macintosh conversion

Unlike Mac clones that contain little or no original Apple hardware, a Mac conversion is an aftermarket enclosure kit that requires the core components of a previously purchased, genuine Apple Mac computer, such as the Macintosh ROM or the motherboard, in order to become a functional computer system. This business model is most commonly used in the car industry, with one of the most famous examples being the Shelby Mustang, a high performance variant of the Ford Mustang, and is protected in the U.S. by the First-sale doctrine and similar legal concepts in most other countries.

While Mac clones traditionally aim to compete directly with Apple's solutions through lower prices, Mac conversions target market segments that lack dedicated solutions from Apple, and where the need for a Mac solution is high enough to justify the combined cost of the full price of the Mac donor computer plus the price of the conversion kit & labor.

The following companies produced Mac conversions:

See also
 IBM PC clone

References

External links
 Mac Clones and New O/S movie from archive.org
 Mac Clones by Manufacturer (at EveryMac.com)
 Macintosh clones (at LowEndMac.com)
 Infos on all macs and clones (incl. details on some mainboard PCBs / at MacInfo.de)
 Apple Squeezes Mac Clones Out of the Market (at LowEndMac.com)